Otter Creek Township is one of twelve townships in Vigo County, Indiana, United States. As of the 2010 census, its population was 9,069 and it contained 3,917 housing units.

History
Markle House and Mill Site was listed on the National Register of Historic Places in 1979.

Geography

Cities, towns, villages
 North Terre Haute
 Terre Haute (north edge)

Unincorporated communities
 Atherton
 Burnett
 Markles
 Otter Creek Junction
 Sandcut
 Spelterville

Adjacent townships
 Florida Township, Parke County (northeast)
 Nevins Township (east)
 Lost Creek Township (southeast)
 Harrison Township (southwest)
 Sugar Creek Township (southwest)
 Fayette Township (west)
 Clinton Township, Vermillion County (northwest)

Cemeteries
The township contains ten cemeteries: Denny, Evans, Haven, Kennedy, Markles, Phillips, Roselawn Memorial Park, Steveson, Stewart and Wood.

Airports and landing strips
 Sky King Airport

School districts
 Vigo County School Corporation

Political districts
 Indiana's 8th congressional district
 State House District 42
 State House District 43
 State Senate District 38

References
 United States Census Bureau 2007 TIGER/Line Shapefiles
 United States Board on Geographic Names (GNIS)
 IndianaMap

External links
  History of Otter Creek Township

Townships in Vigo County, Indiana
Terre Haute metropolitan area
Townships in Indiana